Hoseynaqa Beyk (also Romanized as Ḩoseyn Āqā Beyk; also known as Ḩoseynābād-e Āqā Beyk and Ḩasanābād-e Āqā Beyk) is a village in Gol Banu Rural District, Pain Jam District, Torbat-e Jam County, Razavi Khorasan Province, Iran. At the 2006 census, its population was 376, in 71 families.

References 

Populated places in Torbat-e Jam County